The National Iranian South Oilfields Company (NISOC) (Shirkat-e Mily-e Minatâq-e Nuftxiz-e Jinvâb-e Iran) is a government-owned corporation under the direction of the Ministry of Petroleum of Iran, and operates as a subsidiary of National Iranian Oil Company.

NISOC is incorporated 1971 in Masjed Soleyman, Khouzestan as Oil Service Company of Iran (OSCO). Currently NISOC is Iran's biggest oil producer, and produce  3 million barrels of oil per day. the company is active in a land area more than 400,000 km2 with headquarters in Ahvaz. NISOC is producing about 83% of all crude oil and 17% of natural gas produced in Iran and ranks as the Iran's biggest oil company.

National Iranian South Oilfields Company, through its subsidiaries, produces crude oil, gas, and liquefied gases. The company's reserves portfolio include Ahvaz Field (the world's 3rd largest oil field) and in charge of onshore giant oilfields in Iran (like Gachsaran, Marun, Bibi Hakimeh, RagSefid and Aghajari) and focuses on onshore upstream activity in the province of Khuzestan, Kohgiluyeh and Boyer-Ahmad, Bushehr and Ilam. As Khuzestan is the main oil- and gas-producing province, this entity is among the most significant in the NIOC subsidiaries.

See also

Petroleum industry in Iran
National Iranian Oil Company

References

External links
 NISOC - Official Site

National Iranian Oil Company
Government-owned companies of Iran
Oilfield services companies
Energy companies established in 1971
Non-renewable resource companies established in 1971
Iran
Oil and gas companies of Iran
Iranian companies established in 1971